Louis H. Prange was a member of the Wisconsin State Senate.

Biography
Prange was born in the town of Sheboygan Falls on August 19, 1884. He was a dairy farmer and president of a bank. Prange was interested in soil conservation. He died on his birthday August 19, 1957.

Career
Prange was a member of the senate from 1953 until his death. He was a Republican.

References

External links
 The Political Graveyard

People from Sheboygan Falls, Wisconsin
Businesspeople from Wisconsin
Republican Party Wisconsin state senators
1884 births
1957 deaths
20th-century American politicians
20th-century American businesspeople